Johannes Fischer (born 1887) was a German physicist.

Education 

Fischer studied under Arnold Sommerfeld at the Ludwig Maximilian University of Munich.  His thesis was on the theory of diffraction, and he was awarded his doctorate in 1922.

Books 

 Johannes Fischer Einführung in die klassische Elektrodynamik (Berlin: Springer, 1936)
 Johannes Fischer Größen und Einheiten der Elektrizitätslehre (Berlin: Springer-Verlag, 1961)
 Johannes Fischer Elektrodynamik. Ein Lehrbuch (Springer-Verlag, 1976)

Notes 

1887 births
Year of death missing
20th-century German physicists
Ludwig Maximilian University of Munich alumni